Tim Treude (born 28 January 1990) is a German footballer. He currently plays for TuS Erndtebrück.

References

External links
 

1990 births
Living people
German footballers
Borussia Dortmund II players
Rot-Weiss Essen players
3. Liga players
Association football midfielders